Bastien Ader (born 6 June 1991) is a French rugby league footballer who plays as a  or on the  for Limoux Grizzlies in Elite 1. He previously spent 10 years with Toulouse Olympique in both Elite 1 and the RFL Championship and began his career at Saint Gaudens XIII.

Club career

Saint Gaudens XIII
Ader debuted for St Gaudens on 3 October 2009 in the 34-10 defeat at Limoux and played once more that season, away at Carcassonne. He made a further 18 appearances in the 2010/11 season before signing for Toulouse.

Toulouse Olympique Broncos
He joined Toulouse in 2011 and made his debut in the 22-0 defeat away at Avignon on 9 December 2011 in Elite 1. At the end of 2011, Toulouse left the English Championship and returned to the French league. Ader played 10 games in Elite 1 at the start of the 2015/16 for the Broncos in the hiatus between the end of the 2014/15 season and Toulouse returning to the English competition in 2016.

Toulouse Olympique
Ader played in the first team from 2012/13 until 2020 in Elite 1, League 1 and the RFL Championship. He did not appear for Toulouse in the 2021 promotion winning season. On 20 September 2021, Toulouse announced that Ader would be leaving the club at the end of the season after 10 years

Limoux Grizzlies
Limoux announced that Ader had signed up for the 2021/22 season having left Toulouse.

International career
Ader was named in the French squad for the 2017 Rugby League World Cup.

References

External links
Toulouse Olympique profile
2017 RLWC profile

1991 births
Living people
France national rugby league team players
French rugby league players
Rugby league centres
Saint-Gaudens Bears players
Toulouse Olympique Broncos players
Toulouse Olympique players